Muhammad Riyandi (born 3 January 2000, in Bogor) is an Indonesian professional footballer who plays as a goalkeeper for Liga 1 club Persis Solo and the Indonesia national team. Despite his young age, has been described as a sweeper-keeper, due to his excellent ball control and distribution of the ball.

Club career

Barito Putera
After only training a month in the club's youth team, Riyandi was selected to be part of the Barito Putera squad that played in the 2016 Indonesia Soccer Championship A. At the age of 16, he became the youngest player to play in the highest level of Indonesian football when coach Mundari Karya played him as a starting goalkeeper in a 13 August 2016 match against Persib Bandung, in which he conceded two goals but also managed to thwart a penalty kick attempt. Unfortunately, his performance in four matches in that tournament was insufficient for him to win any playtime in the 2017 Liga 1 season.

Riyandi was Barito's substitute goalkeeper in the 2018 Liga 1 and 2019 Liga 1 seasons, playing 15 games in two years. He earned the starting goalkeeper role in 2020 but only played twice because the 2020 Liga 1 season was canceled after three matches due to the COVID-19 pandemic. He resumed his starter status in the 2021 Menpora Cup, in which he was recognized again for stopping a penalty kick.

Persis Solo
Riyandi was signed for Persis Solo to play in Liga 1 in the 2022–23 season. He made his league debut on 25 July 2022 in a match against Dewa United at the Moch. Soebroto Stadium, Magelang.

International career
Riyandi debuted in a youth national team when he was the starting goalkeeper of the Indonesia team in the 2017 AFF U-18 Youth Championship, which he had to suddenly leave mid-way in the third match after a serious injury. He also participated in the 2018 AFF U-19 Youth Championship and the 2019 AFF U-22 Youth Championship. He was part of the Indonesia team that won silver in the 2019 Southeast Asian Games in the Philippines.
Riyandi received a call to join the senior Indonesia national football team in May 2021. He made his debut for that team in the 2022 FIFA World Cup qualification against United Arab Emirates on 11 June 2021. In November 2021, Indonesian coach, Shin Tae-yong sent Riyandi his first call up to the full national side, for the friendly matches in Turkey against Afghanistan and Myanmar. In November 2022, it was reported that Riyandi received a call-up from the Indonesia for a training camp, in preparation for the 2022 AFF Championship.

Career statistics

Club

International

Honours

International 
Indonesia U-19
 AFF U-19 Youth Championship third place: 2017, 2018
Indonesia U-23
 AFF U-22 Youth Championship: 2019
 Southeast Asian Games  Silver medal: 2019
Indonesia
 AFF Championship runner-up: 2020

References

External links
 
 

2000 births
Living people
Indonesian footballers
People from Bogor
Sportspeople from West Java
PS Barito Putera players
Persis Solo players
Liga 1 (Indonesia) players
Indonesia youth international footballers
Indonesia international footballers
Association football goalkeepers
Competitors at the 2019 Southeast Asian Games
Southeast Asian Games silver medalists for Indonesia
Southeast Asian Games medalists in football